Horsfieldia rufo-lanata is a species of plant in the family Myristicaceae. It is endemic to Sarawak and Sabah in Borneo, Malaysia. It is a vulnerable species threatened by habitat loss.

References

 Whitmore, T.C., Tantra, I.G.M. and Sutisna, U. (eds) 1989. Tree Flora of Indonesia. Forest Research and Development Centre, Bogor, Indonesia.
 de Wilde, W.J.J.O. 1985. "A new account of the genus Horsfieldia (Myristicaceae)", Pt 3., Gardens' Bulletin Singapore 38(2): 185–225.

rufo-lanata
Endemic flora of Borneo
Trees of Borneo
Vulnerable plants
Taxonomy articles created by Polbot